Helladius may refer to:

 Alexander Helladius (1686–?), Greek scholar and humanist
 Helladius (4th century hieromartyr)
 Helladius of Kiev, Ukrainian monk and saint
 Helladius of Auxerre (died 387), Christian bishop and saint
 Helladius of Caesarea, Christian bishop, named by an edict of Theodosius I (30 July 381) to an episcopal see
 Helladius (grammarian), grammarian, professor, and a priest of Zeus
 Helladius of Ptolemais, Christian bishop, present at the First Council of Ephesus (431)
 Helladius of Tarsus, Christian bishop, condemned at the First Council of Ephesus (431)
 Helladius of Toledo (died 633), Christian bishop and saint
 Helladius and Theophilus, two Christian martyrs in Libya, feast day 8 January
 Helladius, Crescentius, Paul and Dioscorides, Christian martyrs, feast day 28 May